Simpson was a manufacturer of household appliances based in Adelaide, Australia. It now exists as a brand within the Electrolux Australia group.

History 
Simpson was founded in 1853 by Alfred M. Simpson (1805-1891) who had migrated from London to South Australia in 1849. Simpson was an innovator and introduced labour-saving machinery and new products such as fire-proof safes, bedsteads, japanned ware, colonial ovens and gas stoves. In 1963 it merged with Pope Industries Ltd to form Simpson Pope Holdings Limited. Pope was originally established in Adelaide as Popes Sprinkler and Irrigation Company in 1925 and after World War II was also a manufacturer of washing machines and hand tools. Pope later manufactured air-conditioning systems. In 1979, the company changed its name to Simpson Holdings Limited—a listed public company. In 1986, Simpson merged with Email Limited, an industrial conglomerate specialising in refrigeration, electric meters and metals distribution. In 1999, the Email conglomerate was taken over and broken up. The appliance business was acquired by Electrolux in 2000.

 Electrolux was still using the Simpson brand name in Australia and New Zealand for a range of washing machines and dryers. The Pope brand (now owned by Toro Australia), continues to be used for lines of garden watering and sprinkler products.

See also

List of South Australian manufacturing businesses

References

External links

Australian brands
Australian subsidiaries of foreign companies
Manufacturing companies based in Adelaide
Home appliance brands
Home appliance manufacturers
Home appliance manufacturers of Australia
Electrolux brands